The 1919 Paris–Tours was the 14th edition of the Paris–Tours cycle race and was held on 8 June 1919. The race started in Paris and finished in Tours. The race was won by Hector Tiberghien.

General classification

References

1919 in French sport
1919
June 1919 sports events